is a character in Resident Evil (Biohazard in Japan), a survival horror video game series created by Japanese company Capcom. Chris debuted as one of the two playable characters of the original Resident Evil (1996), alongside his partner Jill Valentine, as a member of the Raccoon Police Department's Special Tactics And Rescue Service (STARS) unit. Vowing to never let any tragedies like Raccoon City happen again, Chris becomes a founding member of the United Nations' Bioterrorism Security Assessment Alliance (BSAA) to protect the innocent.

Chris also appears in Code: Veronica (2000), in which he looks for his missing younger sister, Claire, and in The Umbrella Chronicles (2007), where he takes down the Umbrella Corporation with Jill. Chris returned in Resident Evil 5 (2009), working alongside his new partner Sheva Alomar, and in Revelations (2012). In Resident Evil 6 (2012), he and his partner Piers Nivans attempt to stop a worldwide bioterrorism attack. He makes a cameo at the end of Resident Evil 7: Biohazard (2017), leading a revised Umbrella Corporation team aligned with the BSAA, and stars in the downloadable content Not a Hero and End of Zoe. Chris returns in Resident Evil Village (2021) as the Alpha leader of the BSAA Hound Wolf squad.

He is also featured in novelizations and other game franchises, including Marvel vs. Capcom and Project X Zone. In later games, such as Resident Evil 7 and Village, his features were based on model Geordie Dandy. In the live-action films, Chris has been portrayed by actors Wentworth Miller and Robbie Amell. Chris has been well received by critics, being considered one of the most important characters in the franchise. Chris has recognized for his sex appeal, with various of his alternate outfits sexualizing the character. Moreover, a scene depicting him punching a boulder in Resident Evil 5 has become a meme.

Concept and design

Hideki Kamiya, described Chris as a "blunt, tough-guy type", admitting that he was a fan of this archetype. During the game's development, Chris was also designed to be physically tougher than Jill Valentine, being able to run faster and absorb more damage. Reuben Langdon did Chris' motion capture for several Resident Evil games.

In Resident Evil 5, Chris' increased muscle mass was to show that he had trained heavily in order to fight the series' powerful villain Albert Wesker bare-handed. Modeler Yosuke Yamagata added that they "made a new design that retained their signature color—green for Chris, blue for Jill—to carry over the same look from the past. The facial structures are mainly based on the visuals of the GameCube version, and we added various details to these in order to develop a realistic structure."

Resident Evil 5s producer Jun Takeuchi said that the series' fans "would really love" a video game featuring both Leon and Chris as the protagonists due to their popularity, and at the same time, it would be "pretty dramatic" if the two characters never met before the series would end. For Resident Evil 6, Chris has a slightly disheveled look due to his alcoholism and post-traumatic amnesia. However, in Resident Evil 7, Chris was given an entirely new design as the producers wanted to give Chris a more realistic look. The character new design made it completely unrecognizable by commentators and players. Executive producer Jun Takeuchi also said that "At the time, we were putting forward Chris as the main character. It was the first time you'd seen him in a while and he had to be made into this big hero. I realised, in retrospect, the process of developing Chris into a hero character is not the same process of developing a Resident Evil game." In Resident Evil Village, Chris is once more redesigned but closer resembles his look in Resident Evil 6, due to fan outrage of his look in Resident Evil 7.

Appearances

In Resident Evil series
Chris Redfield debuted in the original Resident Evil as one of the playable protagonists, along with Jill Valentine, partnered with the rookie officer Rebecca Chambers. He is introduced as a former U.S. Air Force pilot hailing from New York City, and a member of the Raccoon City Police Special Tactics And Rescue Service's (S.T.A.R.S) Alpha team, sent to investigate the disappearance of Bravo team after their helicopter goes missing in a nearby forest. Chris, accompanied by Jill, Albert Wesker, and Barry Burton, soon find themselves trapped in a nearby mansion, filled with horrific monsters and deadly traps. Chris' scenario is more challenging than Jill's, as he has a smaller carrying capacity and lacks certain items. Unlike Jill, he is not equipped with a lock-pick and needs to find keys. He can take a lot more physical damage from enemies than she can. In the end, Chris and his comrades learn how the incident began, and witness the death of Albert Wesker, who was betraying them all along. They also face and kill a prototype Tyrant released by Wesker. Following the so-called "Mansion Incident", Chris leaves Raccoon City, embarking on a personal mission against the Umbrella Corporation, after learning of how Umbrella instigated the viral outbreak in the mansion.

Set five months later, Resident Evil - Code: Veronica sees Chris return as the protagonist of the second half of the game. He attempts to rescue his younger sister, Claire, from the Umbrella Corporation's research facilities on the fictional Rockfort Island, in the Pacific Ocean, and in Antarctica. Upon discovering she is in Antarctica, Chris is briefly confronted by Wesker, who is revealed to have survived the events of the "Mansion Incident" and now has enhanced strength and speed, and is seeking revenge on Chris for having destroyed his plans. Eventually, he confronts Alexia Ashford, the creator of the T-Veronica virus. At the end of the game, he fights with Wesker shortly after killing Alexia. He is no match for him, and their fight is cut short because of the imminent destruction of the base. They vow to finish things another time.

Chris is one of the main characters of Resident Evil: The Umbrella Chronicles, reuniting with Jill Valentine. Sections of the game are essentially a retelling of Resident Evil. The two join a private biohazard containment force, and in 2003 embark on a mission to destroy the Umbrella Corporation after hearing rumours of a new Bio Organic Weapon (B.O.W) being developed. The resulting attack on an Umbrella facility in Russia's Caucasus region is successful.

In Resident Evil 5, Chris is the protagonist of the game and one of the founding members of the UN paramilitary group Bio-terrorism Security Assessment Alliance (B.S.A.A). In the game, he investigates a terrorist threat in Kijuju, Africa while looking for Jill, who is missing and presumed dead. Accompanying him is his new partner Sheva Alomar. Eventually, Chris and Sheva manage to find and free Jill, and ultimately defeat and destroy Wesker who was planning to release a new virus into the atmosphere, ensuring complete global saturation.

In Resident Evil: The Darkside Chronicles Chris appears as a playable character in the "Game of Oblivion" scenario's last chapter, a re-imagining of Code: Veronica. He is also available in the Extreme Battle mode featured in the later versions of Resident Evil 2 (the PlayStation 2 DualShock edition and the PC, Dreamcast and GameCube ports), and is one of the eight playable characters in Resident Evil: The Mercenaries 3D. He returns in Resident Evil: Revelations, with Jill Valentine. 

Resident Evil 6 sees Chris return as one of the three protagonists alongside Leon S. Kennedy, and Jake Muller, the son of Albert Wesker. In the game, Captain Chris Redfield  leads a squad of B.S.A.A soldiers to investigate a bio-terror attack in Europe. Ambushed by Carla Radames, posing as Ada Wong, they suffer severe casualties. Only Chris and Piers Nivans survive the assault, with the rest of his team being turned into monsters by Carla. Chris is overwhelmed with guilt and resigns from the B.S.A.A. Piers convinces Chris to rejoin the B.S.A.A to avenge their fallen comrades. They travel to China to investigate bio-terror activity and find themselves in another C-virus outbreak. While attempting to rescue Jake Muller, who possesses the anti-bodies needed to stop the outbreak, Chris and Piers encounter HAOS, a powerful B.O.W. Piers is grievously injured during the battle and injects himself with the C-virus to gain super-human powers. He saves Chris, but sacrifices himself to ensure HAOS is destroyed. Chris continues to serve the B.S.A.A in Piers' memory.

At the end of Resident Evil 7: Biohazard, a man identifying himself as "Redfield" arrives to rescue Ethan Winters. While the credits refer to the character as Chris Redfield, the helicopter he arrives in is branded with the Umbrella Corporation logo, which is now blue instead of red, initially causing people to question the person's identity. Capcom later confirmed this character to be Chris, in spite of the noticeable change in his appearance due to a different actor portraying him. Additionally, this new version of Umbrella opposes their predecessor's B.O.W research and instead works closely with the B.S.A.A. Chris appeared in the downloadable content campaign, Not a Hero, which was released on December 12, 2017. This subchapter focuses on Chris attempting to apprehend Lucas Baker, and although he fails to save his men, he confronts and kills Lucas. He also appears at the conclusion of the End of Zoe downloadable content.

Chris returned for the eighth main installment in the series, titled Resident Evil Village. During the three-year gap between Resident Evil 7 and Village, Chris has been running an off-the-books covert operation investigating an unidentified village suspected to have biohazards in Transylvania, Romania managed by Mother Miranda. His investigation reveals that Mother Miranda was directly responsible for being the original source of Eveline's outbreak in Louisiana, relocated the Winters family to a nearby village to authenticate his suspicions that Miranda would have an interest in Rosemary Winters. During the events of Village, Chris and his Hound Wolf squad learn that Miranda was capable of shape-shifting and posed as Mia and promptly shot her in order to protect Ethan and Mia, only for his efforts to be foiled in the process. After revealing the nature of his mission to Ethan, Chris saves the real Mia, learning Miranda's connection to the late Oswell E. Spencer (who was killed by Wesker in Resident Evil 5: Lost in Nightmares storyline), and helps plant a bomb on a megamycete in order to destroy the village. During extraction, a dying Ethan gives a recently rescued Rosemary to Chris before sacrificing himself to ensure the village's destruction. With Mia and Rosemary rescued, Chris and his team head to B.S.A.A.'s European H.Q. to demand explanations over their use of Bio Organic Weapons as frontline soldiers.

In films

In the rejected Resident Evil film script written by George A. Romero in 1998, Chris is a Native American civilian and ultimately one of the few survivors. In 2000, Capcom fired Romero and replaced him with Paul W. S. Anderson, who wrote a new script.

Chris appears in the 2010 live-action film Resident Evil: Afterlife, portrayed by Wentworth Miller. In the film, Chris is found trapped in a maximum security cell after his unit's attempt to control the T-virus in Los Angeles goes haywire; the survivors who find him believe him to be a prisoner. He is reunited with his sister Claire, who cannot remember him because of memory damage caused by an Umbrella mind control device. He, Alice and Claire eventually defeat Albert Wesker and rescue imprisoned survivors being used for Umbrella's experiments. Miller said he prepared for the role by searching for images and videos of Chris on the Internet, as well as doing cardio for endurance. In the reboot film Resident Evil: Welcome to Raccoon City (2021),  Robbie Amell portrayed Chris. 

In 2017, Chris was one of the main characters in the film Resident Evil: Vendetta, alongside Leon S. Kennedy and Rebecca Chambers. Unlike the live action films, the animated films are in the same continuity as the games. He returned in the sequel, Resident Evil: Death Island.

Other appearances
During the release of the Japanese Sega Saturn version of the original game, Capcom published a promotional sourcebook The True Story Behind Biohazard, containing an original short story titled "Biohazard: The Beginning" by Hiroyuku Ariga. It depicts the events before the first game and fleshes out Chris' character, describing the deaths of his parents in a car accident, and his service in the United States Air Force (USAF). Chris joined the USAF as a teenager, quickly becoming an accomplished pilot as well as a top marksman, but received a dishonourable discharge in the mid-90s for disobeying a direct order. He later became a drifter until enlisting (on Burton's recommendation) in the newly established Raccoon City branch of the S.T.A.R.S. Chris also appears in several Resident Evil comic books by WildStorm, Image Comics and Marvel Comics. The character was featured in Resident Evil-themed attraction at Universal Studios Japan's Halloween Horror Nights.

Outside the Resident Evil franchise, Chris also is a playable character in the crossover fighting games Marvel vs. Capcom 3: Fate of Two Worlds and Ultimate Marvel vs. Capcom 3. The game's first cinematic trailer showed him fighting against Hulk. He also appears in the crossover tactical role-playing game Project X Zone, the first time in a non-Capcom game, wearing his Resident Evil: Revelations outfit. He returns in the game's sequel, Project X Zone 2. Chris also appears as a playable character in Marvel vs. Capcom: Infinite, and is featured in the story as one of the heroes fighting against Ultron Sigma. Chris appears as a Spirit in the Nintendo crossover video game Super Smash Bros. Ultimate. Chris makes a cameo appearance in the PlayStation 5 game Astro's Playroom. Chris also appears in Dead by Daylight as a legendary costume for Leon S. Kennedy. On October 26, 2021, Chris and Jill made their appearance in Fortnite Battle Royale. In February 2022, both Chris and Leon appeared as an easter egg in Dying Light 2.

Reception

Chris Redfield has been well received by critics and fans alike. According to PSU in 2011, Chris is "as synonymous with the venerable horror series as the zombies and unintentionally hilarious, cheese-tastic dialogue" and along with Jill forms its "nucleus". PSU described the look as "a beastly, muscle-bound warrior with biceps the size of water melons". That same year, Chris and his sister Claire were included in IGNs "Ultimate Zombie Strike Team", Chris for his "long, fruitful career killing zombies" that "proved that Umbrella's fearsome bio-weapons are no match for a lone warrior with guts". Also in 2009, the Gameplanet website stated that if Chris and Leon S. Kennedy both appeared together in the next game it would be "awesome", adding that both are the series' main protagonists. Chris was also repeatedly compared with Leon by IGN, both of them being regarded as the series' leading heroes. In 2010, GamesRadar website featured his team-up with Sheva in an article about gaming's "most violent double acts" for their actions in Resident Evil 5. That same year, Joystick Divisions James Hawkins ranked Chris and Jill as the fifth top duo in video game history, as "the two of them together make a force that cannot be slowed by even the most sophisticated; undead forces;" in 2012, Brittany Vincent of Complex ranked them as the 15th "most ass-kicking" game duo.

Negative criticism includes Chris ranking fifth on IGNs 2009 list of most overrated video game characters, with a suggestion that he should "ditch the 'roids and concentrate on getting the job done", and included in UGO.coms 2010 list of top ten out-of-luck game characters for his failures across the series. GameSpy called his new design in Resident Evil 5 a cross between Colin Farrell and Hugh Jackman" in particular, and became a source of controversy and was often ridiculed. GameSpot gave Chris the special award for "character most likely to fail a performance-enhancing drug test" in the Dubious Honors awards in 2009, adding that "the man is clearly a walking pharmacy". Including him on its list of "ten game heroes who fail at the simple stuff" for his inability to shoot while moving in RE5, GameDaily recommended he "spend a little more time on the shooting range and a little less time pumping iron in front of a mirror". Joystiq commented that during The Umbrella Chronicles, Chris possibly started his "steroid abuse", a suggestion also made by IGN. In 2011, BeefJack featured Chris among the five game characters who are supposed to be sexy but turned out awkward, as "he looks like the runner-up in a Popeye lookalike contest". On the other hand, when GamesRadar compared his Code Veronica and RE5 designs while trying to evaluate which would fit better for a zombie apocalypse, they found the latter provided a better chance to survive to a zombie attack. It also judged Chris from the original game as "horribly ill-prepared". In 2021, several staff from Kotaku cited Chris is the worst of the Resident Evil heroes, considering him to be "bland" and "boring".

Several publications have noted the character's lack of consistent visual design for his appearances throughout the Resident Evil franchise. Polygons Cass Marshall noted his variations in body mass throughout the games by repeatedly changing from lean to muscular and back again, while Ian Walker from Kotaku compared his appearances in Resident Evil 7 and Resident Evil Village as "transition[ing] from global bio-terrorism agent to [...] a henchman in a British crime comedy written and directed by Guy Ritchie". Ravi Sinha of GamingBolt considered the character's design at Resident Evil 7 among the worst in video games, noting that "the buffed and macho man's design" was replaced into "normal looking guy".

Sex symbol
Chris has often been recognized for his sex appeal since his redesign in Resident Evil 5. Natalie Romano of GameZone ranked Chris as fourth on a list of the top five "gaming gods" of 2009 for his new look, describing him as "one gorgeous hunk" with "a killer body and dreamy good-looks". Joystick Divisions James Hawkins ranked Chris as the seventh sexiest video game character, commenting that despite Chris getting "matched up with some of the finest damsels in all of video gaming, he never comes across as sleazy" and shows loyalty to his partners. Hawkins moreover singles out Chris' "awesomely massive biceps". Pixel Vultures Marco Cocomello included him in a 2016 list of the most attractive characters from recent video games, highlighting his muscular arms and abs. Ed Nightingale of PinkNews, an online newspaper marketed to the LGBT community, described Chris as "burly" and having arms "to thirst over". Eurogamers Matt Wales, in reviewing Resident Evil Revelations, described Chris as the "supreme beefcake".

Many of Chris' alternate outfits since the release of Resident Evil 5 have been acknowledged for highlighting his muscular physique and sexualizing the character. Within Revelations, Chris has an unlockable outfit where he dresses as a sailor, which Jason Wojnar of TheGamer argued as being the best oufit Chris has worn throughout the franchise, describing it as "charming" and showing off his legs. While Chloi Rad described the Sailor outfit as one of the 11 weirdest alternate costumes in video games, she acknowledged that it is revealing akin to the costumes worn by female characters, further describing it as "sexy". While similarly describing it as "silly", Craig Pearson of Rock Paper Shotgun also found the outfit "sexy", highlighting a mod for Resident Evil Village that places Chris in said outfit. Trace Thurman of Bloody Disgusting also found Chris' Sailor outfit to be one of the "silliest" in the franchise, while recognizing that "never before has Chris looked sexier", further highlighting his shirtless Warrior outfit from Resident Evil 5.

Queer appeal and fandom
Chris has been described as a gay icon and proven popular with gaymers, with his relationship with Piers having been highlighted. The Geekiarys Farid-ul-Haq has described Chris as a queer icon, as has Dread XPs Lee Meyer, who acknowledged that the character has "long been a favorite of the gay community", for various reasons which include his "seeming lack of interest in any women". In a poll held on subreddit r/askgaybros discussing which video game character is the most attractive, different gaymers highlighted Chris, some for his physique; fan works depicting him and Piers as a couple were also cited. According to Urko Miguel of AreaJugones, despite Piers' death at the end of Resident Evil 6, the Chris/Piers pairing remains popular within the fandom, which has been given the ship name Nivanfield. Farid-ul-Haq has also expressed his support of the Chris/Piers ship. Tracy Gossage of Gayly Dreadful argued that as Resident Evil games tend to not feature same-sex pairings, with Chris and Piers being one of the few exceptions, this makes it is "easy to read into these relationship" if ones wants to.

Boulder punching scene
Near the climax of Resident Evil 5, Chris Redfield and Sheva Alomar engage in a final confrontation against a heavily mutated Albert Wesker inside a volcano, but the duo become separated. In order for them to reunite, the player controlling Chris must engage in a button mashing sequence where Chris pushes and punches a large boulder until it falls into the lava. The scene became iconic and memorable within the Resident Evil series, largely due to its ridiculousness. It became the subject of memes, with fans using it to demonstrate Chris' masculinity. In Resident Evil Village, during the boss fight with Karl Heisenberg, Karl calls Chris a "boulder-punching asshole".

Merchandise
Various types of merchandising have been released based on Chris. A statuette of Chris from the same game was also released in 2009 by Gaya Entertainment. A sand globe with Sheva and Chris was included among the pre-order bonuses for Resident Evil 5. Three perfumes styled on Leon Kennedy, Chris Redfield, and Jill Valentine were produced by Capcom for Japan buyers in 2021. The publisher also released a replica of Chris' trench coat from Resident Evil Village the same year. In 2023, Kotobukiya opened up pre-orders for ARTFX figures of Chris from Resident Evil: Vendetta.

References

External links

Action film characters
Capcom protagonists
Characters in Japanese novels
Male horror film characters
Fictional American people in video games
Fictional American police officers
Fictional aviators
Fictional characters from New York City
Fictional government agents
Fictional gunfighters in video games
Fictional knife-fighters
Fictional martial artists in video games
Fictional MCMAP practitioners
Fictional military captains
Fictional military personnel in video games
Fictional police officers in video games
Fictional private military members
Fictional sole survivors
Fictional special forces personnel
Fictional United Nations personnel
Fictional United States Air Force personnel
Fictional zombie hunters
Male characters in video games
Resident Evil characters
Fictional soldiers in video games
Fictional characters with post-traumatic stress disorder
Video game characters introduced in 1996
Vigilante characters in video games